Abundance Salaou (born 5 July 2004) is an Ivorian footballer who plays for IFK Göteborg as a midfielder.

References

External links 
 

2004 births
Living people
Ivorian footballers
Allsvenskan players
IFK Göteborg players
Association football midfielders
Ivorian expatriate footballers
Expatriate footballers in Sweden
Ivorian expatriate sportspeople in Sweden